Charles Newsome is a British stuntman, stunt performer and stunt double and actor for film and television. He has performed in stunt sequences in movies such as Sherlock Holmes and Prince of Persia: The Sands of Time.

Stunt filmography

Actor filmography

References

External links
 
 Charles Ramsay official website

British stunt performers
British male television actors
Living people
Year of birth missing (living people)
Place of birth missing (living people)
British male film actors